St. Clement Catholic Elementary/Junior High School is a school in the Edmonton Catholic School District serving the Knottwood and Millhurst communities, bounded by 91st Street and 66th Street from 23rd Avenue south to the city limits of approximately 9th Avenue including Summerside and Ellerslie Crossing. 

Transportation services by bus are available. Bus services provided by Edmonton Transit from the Lakewood and Town Centre terminals make the school very accessible.

Extracurricular activities
Intramurals, Student Leadership Team, Junior High Inter-school Athletics, Ski Club, Spring Carnival, Spirit Days, Family BBQ / Curriculum Evening, St. Clement Friendship Day, Cross Country Run, Journal Indoor Games, Young Authors’ Conference, talent show, Arts Alive Conference

Programs
International Baccalaureate (IB) Program  - Kindergarten to Gr. 9
Study Buddies
K-9 Literacy Focus
Fine arts program
Recognitions for student academic excellence, effort and citizenship throughout the year.
Extended physical education and a variety of complementary course offerings in Fine Arts and Career and Technology Studies provide junior high students with interesting learning opportunities.
Year End Awards Evening celebrates student achievement in academics, sport, effort, citizenship
Field trip program

References
http://ecsd.net/

Elementary schools in Edmonton
Middle schools in Edmonton
International Baccalaureate schools in Alberta
Educational institutions established in 1977
1977 establishments in Alberta